George Carmichael [George de Carmichel] was a 15th-century bishop-elect of Glasgow. He was elected to the bishopric in early 1483 soon after the death of his predecessor John Laing. He was never consecrated. The Pope, Pope Sixtus IV, rejected his election because he had previously reserved the see for himself. Sixtus provided instead Robert Blackadder to the bishopric. He may have died in 1484 on the way to the Holy See to appeal the pope's decision.

References
Dowden, John, The Bishops of Scotland, ed. J. Maitland Thomson, (Glasgow, 1912)

15th-century births
1484 deaths
Bishops of Glasgow
15th-century Scottish Roman Catholic bishops